1999–2000 Trabzonspor season  was the 25th consecutive season that the club played in the 1. Lig.

Season summary 

Trabzonspor finished 6th the 1999–2000 season. Trabzonspor was included in the Turkish Cup from 3rd round. Galatasaray defeated Trabzonspor 2 – 1 in Trabzon in quarter finals. Trabzonspor could not qualify to play in any European cup games for the 1999–2000 season.

Squad

Transfers

In

Out

League table

Scorers

Hat-tricks

1. lig games

1st half

2nd half

Turkish Cup

European Cups 

Trabzonspor couldn't qualify to play in any European cup games in 1999–2000 season.

See also 
 Trabzonspor
 1999–2000 1.Lig
 1999–2000 Turkish Cup

Notes

Sources 
 Turkish Football Federation 
 Trabzonspor Official Site
 MAÇKOLİK

Trabzonspor seasons
Turkish football clubs 1999–2000 season